Sidney Creek is a stream in the U.S. state of South Dakota.

Sidney Creek derives its name from the Sidney-Black Hills Trail.

See also
List of rivers of South Dakota

References

Rivers of Custer County, South Dakota
Rivers of South Dakota